Hylobius pinicola, the couper collar weevil, is a species of pine weevil in the family of beetles known as Curculionidae. It is found in North America.

References

Further reading

 
 

Molytinae
Articles created by Qbugbot
Beetles described in 1864
Beetles of North America